In Heaven is the first Korean studio album (second overall) by South Korean boy band JYJ. It was released on 28 September 2011 under C-JeS Entertainment with three covers: Red, Blue and Brown Editions, and a Black Edition a week later. It was released as digital format on 15 September 2011, and physical format (CD) on 28 September 2011.

A Special Edition was released on 21 November 2011 with two new remix tracks and bonus DVD containing music videos and behind-the-scene footages.

The music video for title track "In Heaven" features Kim Junsu and South Korean actress Song Ji-hyo. The single of it was released following the death of Park Yong-ha with his close friend Jaejoong.

Reception
According to its agency, it sold 165,000 copies within 3 days of release and surpassed 450,000 sales mark.

The album peaked at number one on Gaon Weekly Album Chart for the week starting on 2 October 2011 and was the best-selling album on Gaon Monthly Album Chart for September with 100,433 sales and second for October with 81,867 sales.

The title track "In Heaven" debuted on Billboard's Korea K-Pop Hot 100 at number 10 for the week of 22 September 2011.

Track listing

Music videos 
 "In Heaven" - features Song Ji-hyo
 "Get Out"

Release history

Charts

Album chart 

* Available in Taiwan as imports

Single chart

Other songs charted

References

2011 albums
JYJ albums
A&G Modes albums